(born May 19, 1997) is a Japanese professional wrestler currently signed to World Wonder Ring Stardom promotion. She is a former one-time Future of Stardom Champion.

Professional wrestling career

World Wonder Ring Stardom (2019–present) 
Iida made her debut at World Wonder Ring Stardom on January 14, 2019, at Stardom's 8th anniversary show where she faced Natsuko Tora in a losing effort. After the match, Iida joined "J.A.N." (Jungle Assault Nation), a unit consists of Jungle Kyona, Kaori Yoneyama and Tora. On March 10, Iida received her first title match when she challenged Utami Hayashishita for the Future of Stardom Championship, but was unsuccessful. On April 14, during the annual draft, Kyona lost to a five-way against four other faction leaders where the loser of the match must disband their own unit, therefore, J.A.N. was forced to disband. Mayu Iwatani, the leader of "Stars", chose Iida to join her unit.

On February 24, 2020, Iida faced her trained and former World of Stardom Champion Kagetsu in a losing effort during Kagetsu's retirement show, which took place outside of Stardom. On July 17, Iida faced Maika and Saya Kamitani in a three-way match for the vacant Future of Stardom Championship, which was won by Maika. On November 15, Iida challenged Maika for the Future of Stardom Championship, but was unsuccessful. After the match, Iida indicated she wanted one more match for the title, thus continuing her rivalry with Maika. On December 20, Iida defeated Maika to win the Future of Stardom Championship in a three-way, which also involved Kamitani.

On January 17, 2021, on Stardom's 10th anniversary show, Iida had her first successful title defense, when she defeated Unagi Sayaka to retain the Future of Stardom Championship. On May 10, The championship was vacated after Iida suffered a torn ACL and LCL injuries.

After a ten-month injury hiatus, Iida returned at Stardom New Blood 1 on March 11, 2022, where she teamed up with Hanan to defeat JTO's Tomoka Inaba and Aoi. On the first night of the Stardom World Climax 2022 from March 26, Iida unsuccessfully faced Mirai. On the second night from March 27, she competed in a 18-women Cinderella Rumble match won by Mei Suruga. At Stardom Cinderella Tournament 2022, Iida made it to the quarterfinals where she got defeaed by Koguma. At Stardom Golden Week Fight Tour on May 5, 2022, she teamed up with stablemates Hanan and Momo Kohgo and defeated Oedo Tai (Saki Kashima, Ruaka and Rina).

Championships and accomplishments 
 World Wonder Ring Stardom
 Future of Stardom Championship (1 time)
 Stardom Year-End Award (1 time)
 Best Unit Award (2022)

References

External links 
 World Wonder Ring Stardom profile 
 

1997 births
Living people
Japanese female professional wrestlers
Sportspeople from Chiba Prefecture
21st-century professional wrestlers
Future of Stardom Champions